Jerzy Siankiewicz (17 October 1930 – 2 November 1984) was a Polish field hockey player. He competed in the men's tournament at the 1952 Summer Olympics.

References

External links
 

1930 births
1984 deaths
Polish male field hockey players
Olympic field hockey players of Poland
Field hockey players at the 1952 Summer Olympics
Sportspeople from Poznań
People from Poznań Voivodeship (1921–1939)